Dick's Picks Volume 17 is the 17th live album in the Dick's Picks series of releases by the Grateful Dead. It was recorded on September 25, 1991 at the Boston Garden in Boston, Massachusetts, with two additional tracks from the March 31, 1991 show at Greensboro.

Enclosure

Included with the release is a single sheet folded in half, yielding a four-page enclosure.  The front duplicates the cover of the CD, and the back features a rectangular color photograph of the inside of the venue with the house lights on, after the sound system has been set up but before the audience has arrived.  The two pages inside contain a single wide color photograph of the band on stage along with the contents of and credits for the release.

Track listing

Disc one
First set:
"Help on the Way" (Garcia, Hunter) – 4:15 →
"Slipknot!" (Garcia, Godchaux, Kreutzmann, Lesh, Weir) – 5:30 →
"Franklin's Tower" (Garcia, Hunter, Kreutzmann) – 10:41
"Walkin' Blues" (House) – 6:30
"It Must Have Been the Roses" (Hunter) – 5:45 →
"Dire Wolf" (Garcia, Hunter) – 3:59
"Queen Jane Approximately" (Dylan) – 7:16
"Tennessee Jed" (Garcia, Hunter) – 7:50 →
"The Music Never Stopped" (Barlow, Weir) – 8:18

Disc two
Second set:
"Victim or the Crime" (Graham, Weir) – 8:24 →
"Crazy Fingers" (Garcia, Hunter) – 9:38 →
"Playing in the Band" (Hart, Hunter, Weir) – 9:22 →
"Terrapin Station" (Garcia, Hunter) – 12:47 →
"Boston Clam Jam"  (Grateful Dead) – 5:37 →
"Drums" (Hart, Kreutzmann) – 11:04 →
"Space" (Grateful Dead) – 8:15 →

Disc three
Second set, continued:
"That Would Be Something" (McCartney) – 3:51 →
"Playing in the Band" (Hart, Hunter, Weir) – 5:23 →
"China Doll" (Garcia, Hunter) – 5:46 →
"Throwing Stones" (Barlow, Weir) – 8:59 →
"Not Fade Away" (Holly, Petty) – 9:01
Encore:
"The Mighty Quinn (Quinn the Eskimo)" (Dylan) – 4:43
March 31, 1991:
"Samson and Delilah" (traditional) – 7:47 →
"Eyes of the World" (Garcia, Hunter) – 23:30

Personnel 
Grateful Dead:
Jerry Garcia – lead guitar, vocals
Mickey Hart – drums
Bruce Hornsby – keyboards, accordion, vocals
Bill Kreutzmann – drums
Phil Lesh – bass, vocals
Bob Weir – rhythm guitar, vocals
Vince Welnick – keyboards, vocals
Production:
Dick Latvala, David Lemieux – tape archivists
Gecko Graphics – design
Dan Healy – recording
Jeffrey Norman – CD mastering
John Cutler – magnetic scrutinizer
Jim Anderson, Susana Millman – photography

See also 
Dick's Picks series
Grateful Dead discography

References

17
2000 live albums
Albums recorded at the Boston Garden